Edenwold is a village in the Canadian province of Saskatchewan within the Rural Municipality of Edenwold No. 158 and Census Division No. 6.

History 
Edenwold incorporated as a village on October 3, 1912.

Demographics 

See also 

 List of communities in Saskatchewan
 Villages of Saskatchewan

References

External links

Villages in Saskatchewan
Edenwold No. 158, Saskatchewan
Division No. 6, Saskatchewan